Ergilio Pedro Hato (7 November 1926 – 18 December 2013), also known as Pantera Negra (Black Panther), was a goalkeeper from Curaçao in the former Netherlands Antilles. He was well known in the Caribbean and his reputation achieved beyond the boundaries of the region. He received offers to large teams including Ajax Amsterdam, Feyenoord Rotterdam and Real Madrid Club de Fútbol. However, he turned down the offers because he chose not to play professionally.

History
His mother’s last name was Hatot, but the Civil Registry couldn’t place the name, so they decided to spell Ergilio’s last name “Hato”. Hato was always an avid soccer player. Back in the day, school yards were set up as soccer fields and monks encouraged playing before school, during breaks, and after school. Hato (19 in 1945) would have been drafted for military service had the Curaçao Soccer Federation not hosted a large international competition with teams from Colombia, Aruba, Suriname and the Netherlands Feyenoord in 1945. Curaçao’s “Dream Team” delivered a clean sweep. Feyenoord came in second. A huge disappointment for the Dutch, and a testament to Curaçao’s innate talent despite its small size and limited resources.

Hato became known as the best goalkeeper in Latin America and the Caribbean. He took the Netherlands Antilles team to the Olympics in 1952 (they lost against Turkey) and led Curaçao’s team to a Bronze medal at the Pan American Games in 1955. Hato’s international notoriety awarded him several lucrative offers to play professional soccer internationally, rejecting offers from teams from South America and Europe including Real Madrid, AFC Ajax and Feyenoord. He pursued a career at the ALM Antillean Airlines, raised a family,  and played in his local club, CRKSV Jong Holland.

He lived up to his many nicknames on the field: Pantera Negra (Black Panter), Vliegende Vogel (Flying Bird) and Man van Elastiek (Elastic Man).

Footnotes
The Dutch publishers SWP have released a book about Mister Hato and his life. More to be found at https://web.archive.org/web/20070929134838/http://www.sportgericht.nl/489.html this publishing is to be considered the only publication in book form about Hato, in Dutch and Antilian language.

Honours
 The Ergilio Hato Stadium in Willemstad, Curaçao was named after him.
 The Hato International Airport in Willemstad, Curaçao is also named in honour of him, as he was also passionate about aviation.
Central American and Caribbean Games Bronze Medal (1): 1946
Central American and Caribbean Games Gold Medal (1): 1950
Pan American Games Bronze Medal (1): 1955
CCCF Championship Silver Medal (1): 1955

International goals

Source: RSSSF

References

External links
 http://www.soccer-db.info/

1926 births
2003 deaths
Dutch Antillean footballers
Curaçao footballers
Footballers at the 1952 Summer Olympics
Olympic footballers of the Netherlands Antilles
Pan American Games bronze medalists for the Netherlands Antilles
People from Willemstad
Association football goalkeepers
Pan American Games medalists in football
Central American and Caribbean Games gold medalists for the Netherlands Antilles
Central American and Caribbean Games bronze medalists for the Netherlands Antilles
Competitors at the 1946 Central American and Caribbean Games
Competitors at the 1950 Central American and Caribbean Games
Footballers at the 1955 Pan American Games
Central American and Caribbean Games medalists in football
Medalists at the 1955 Pan American Games